Liguo may refer to:

Liguo, Hainan, a town in Ledong Li Autonomous County, Hainan, China
Liguo, Jiangsu, a town in Xuzhou, Jiangsu, China
Liguo Township, a township in Binzhou, Shandong, China